Podbřezí is a municipality and village in Rychnov nad Kněžnou District in the Hradec Králové Region of the Czech Republic. It has about 600 inhabitants.

Administrative parts
Villages of Chábory and Lhota Netřeba are administrative parts of Podbřezí.

Sights
The main landmark of Podbřezí is the baroque Skalka Castle. It is inaccessible to the public. There is also the Jewish cemetery with the oldest tomb being from 1725.

Gallery

References

Villages in Rychnov nad Kněžnou District